Farpoint is an American progressive rock band formed in Dalzell, South Carolina in 1997 by Kevin Jarvis and Rick Walker. The band's sound is based on a diversity of influences, ranging from progressive, folk and hard rock to Celtic, classical, new age and bluegrass.

The band has released a total of 7 albums. The first four feature art by visual artist David Frain. The fifth studio album, KINDRED, was released by 10t Records in 2011. Their first live album is Water of Life: Live at the Sumter Opera House, recorded in Sumter, SC in June 2011, released by Starcross Music in July, 2012. Their 6th studio album. PAINT THE DARK, was released by 10t Records in summer of 2014.

Band members

Current members
Kevin Jarvis - guitars, keys, mandolin, backing vocals (1997–present)Rick Walker - drums, percussion, backing 
vocals (1997–2001, 2003–present)Frank Tyson- bass guitar, backing vocals (1999–present)Dean Hallal - lead and backing vocals, rhythm guitar (2006–present)Jennifer Meeks Weich - lead and backing vocals, flute (2006–2011, 2015–present)

Past members
Johnathan Rodriguez - drums (2001–2003)Dana Oxendine - vocals, flute (1997–2005)Mike Avins - lead guitar (2002–2005)Clark Boone - lead vocals (1999–2005)Sam Sanders - lead and rhythm guitar (2008–2009)Abby Thompson - lead and backing vocals, keys (2011–2014)
Dave Auerbach - lead and rhythm guitar (2009–2011, 2015–2016)

Discography

Studio albums
 First Light (2002)
 Grace (2003)
 From Dreaming to Dreaming (2004)
 Cold Star Quiet Star (2008)
 Kindred (2011)
 Paint the Dark (2014)
 The Journey (2022)

Live albums
 Water of Life: Live at the Sumter Opera House (2012)

Compilation albums
 Starcrossed  (2017)

References

External links 

 
 10t Records Artist Page

Musical groups established in 1997
American progressive rock groups
Musical groups from South Carolina